Village Mall may refer to:
Village Mall (Danville, Illinois), a shopping mall in Danville, Illinois.
Village Mall, a defunct mall in Willingboro, New Jersey
Village Mall, a former shopping mall in Cleveland, Tennessee, a predecessor of the Bradley Square Mall.
Village Mall, the former name of Auburn Mall in Auburn, Alabama.

See also
The Village Shopping Center in Gary, Indiana